Duck Soup is a silent comedy short film starring Stan Laurel and Oliver Hardy prior to their official billing as the duo Laurel and Hardy. The team appeared in a total of 107 films between 1921 and 1951.

Plot
Fleeing a group of forest rangers, who are rounding up tramps to serve as firefighters, Laurel and Hardy take refuge in a mansion. The owner has gone on vacation and the servants are away, so Hardy pretends to be the owner and offers to rent the house to an English couple. Hardy gets Laurel to pose as the maid. Unfortunately, the owner returns and tells the would-be renters that he owns the house. Laurel and Hardy then flee again and are caught by the rangers and forced to fight wildfires.

Production background
Duck Soup was considered a lost film for nearly fifty years, until a print was discovered in 1974. It was previously thought by film scholars that the comedians shared few scenes, if any, but in fact they appear as a team throughout the entire picture, albeit rather primitively, dressed in tramp costumes, with Hardy sporting an unshaven chin, monocle, and top hat. In the next few films, Laurel and Hardy were together as separate performers and not working as a double act, before their potential as a team was used again, notably in Do Detectives Think? (1927), another Hal Roach two-reeler.

The film was directed by Fred Guiol. However, the more important contribution was by the films' supervising director, Leo McCarey, who probably more than anyone else at Roach saw the greatest possibilities for Laurel and Hardy as a comedy team. McCarey later used the same title for the classic Marx Brothers film, Duck Soup, which he directed for Paramount Pictures in 1933. The sketch on which the film was based was written by Stan Laurel's father, Arthur J. Jefferson.

Duck Soup was remade as Another Fine Mess (1930).

The print found in 1974 was a cropped 9.5mm re-release with French intertitles replacing the originals. However, since then a pristine quality full aperture 35mm nitrate print was located at the BFI National Archive, which appears to be from a British re-release. A restored version of the film with a theater organ soundtrack accompaniment was televised on the Movies! channel in the U.S. on December 26, 2020.

Cast

References

Further reading

External links
 
 
 
 

1927 films
1920s English-language films
1927 comedy films
American silent short films
American black-and-white films
Films directed by Fred Guiol
Laurel and Hardy (film series)
Films with screenplays by H. M. Walker
1920s rediscovered films
Silent American comedy films
Rediscovered American films
1920s American films
American comedy short films